Vi Huyền Đắc (Hải Ninh, today part of Quảng Ninh, 18 December 1899 - 16 August 1976) was a Vietnamese playwright.

His early works were similar to those of Nam Xuong, poking fun at the Francophile Hanoi bourgeoisie, in 'Ông ký Cóp,' or the play 'Kim tiền' (Money) denouncing greed.

Works
Gengis Khan (in French) 1962
He was also active as a translator.

References

Vietnamese dramatists and playwrights
1899 births
1958 deaths
20th-century dramatists and playwrights